The 17th Ariel Awards ceremony, organized by the Mexican Academy of Film Arts and Sciences (AMACC) took place in 1975, in Mexico City. During the ceremony, AMACC presented the Ariel Award in 13 categories honoring films released in 1974. La Choca, La Otra Virginidad, and Presagio were the most nominated films, and La Choca and La Otra Virginidad tied for Best Picture. Emilio "El Indio" Fernández won for Best Director for La Choca, it was his fourth win in the category, becoming the most awarded director in the category; he held the record for 35 years, until Carlos Carrera tied with four wins in 2010 with the film Backyard: El Traspatio. La Choca was the most awarded film with six accolades; La venida del Rey Olmos and Presagio followed with two wins each.

Winners and nominees
Winners are listed first and highlighted with boldface.

Multiple nominations and awards

The following six films received multiple nominations:

Films that received multiple awards:

References

Ariel Awards ceremonies
1975 film awards
1975 in Mexico